South Coast Railway Stadium is a multi purpose stadium in Visakhapatnam, Andhra Pradesh. The ground is mainly used for organizing matches of football, cricket and other sports.  The stadium has hosted a first-class matches in 1964 when Andhra cricket team played against Hyderabad cricket team. The ground has held seven further first-class matches, the last of which came in the 1997/98 Ranji Trophy when Andhra cricket team and the Goa cricket team.

The ground has also hosted six List A matches from 1997 to 2002; since then stadium has hosted non-first-class matches.

References

External links 
 cricketarchive
 cricinfo
 SERA

Sports venues in Visakhapatnam
Cricket grounds in Andhra Pradesh
Sports venues completed in 1964
1964 establishments in Andhra Pradesh
20th-century architecture in India